Niha (Arabic: نيحا), is a village in Batroun District, North Governorate, Lebanon.

References

Batroun District
Populated places in the North Governorate
Maronite Christian communities in Lebanon